Events in the year 1946 in Indonesia. The country had an estimated population of  69,973,500 people.

Incumbents
 President: Sukarno
 Vice President: Mohammad Hatta 
 Prime Minister: Sutan Sjahrir
 Chief Justice: Kusumah Atmaja

Events
 Continuing Indonesian National Revolution
 February - Disestablishment of the First Sjahrir Cabinet
 24 March - Bandung Sea of Fire
 March - Establishment of the Second Sjahrir Cabinet
 27 June to 3 July - 3 July Affair
 28 June - Disestablishment of the Second Sjahrir Cabinet
 5 July - Establishment of the Bank Negara Indonesia
 July - Malino Conference
 October - Establishment of the Third Sjahrir Cabinet
 15 November - Linggadjati Agreement
 December - End of Bersiap phase of the Indonesian National Revolution
 Establishment of the Indonesian Olympic Committee
 Establishment of the National Sports Committee of Indonesia

References

 
1940s in Indonesia
Years of the 20th century in Indonesia